Roberto Belangero (São Paulo, June 28, 1928 – São Paulo, October 30, 1996) was a Brazilian football (soccer) player. He is considered one of the best defensive midfielders in Corinthians history.

He also played in the Brazil national football team, but was forced to miss the 1958 World Cup in Sweden due to an injury. He played for Brazil in the 1956 and 1957 South American Championships.

References

External links
Profile at CBF.com.br

1928 births
1996 deaths
Brazilian footballers
Brazil international footballers
Sport Club Corinthians Paulista players
Brazilian football managers
Sport Club Corinthians Paulista managers
Association football defenders
Footballers from São Paulo
Paulista Futebol Clube managers
Marília Atlético Clube managers